Darnell Wilson (born September 22, 1974) is an American boxer. He challenged once for the WBA World Cruiserweight title in 2008. He is perhaps best remembered for his brutal left-hook knockouts of Emmanuel Nwodo and David Rodriguez.

Background 
Born in Cleveland, Ohio, and raised in Gaithersburg, Maryland, He graduated from Quince Orchard High School in Gaithersburg, Maryland.

Amateur career 
Many people confused Darnell Wilson with the outstanding amateur Darnell Wilson who won the United States Amateur Light Middleweight Championship three years in a row (1997–99).

Professional career 
Known as "Ding-A-Ling Man", Wilson turned pro in 2000 as a light heavyweight. He showed a world-class punch and a good chin but couldn't outbox his opponents. His best results were draws with George Jones (record 19–2) and James Lubwama (record 18–1).

In 2005 he moved up to cruiserweight. There he was outpointed by prospects/fringe contenders Vadim Tokarev (17–0), Felix Cora Jr. (17–0–2), and veteran Andre Purlette (record 38–2) and also lost to heavyweight Owen Beck.

In late 2006 he at least managed to KO another former light heavyweight in southpaw Daniel Judah (21–1–3), but at age 32 seemed to be going nowhere. He says of this time: "I was diagnosed. My adrenal glands were being worn down. I would go flat after a few rounds of sparring because of a bad effect from energy drinks."

His career direction changed dramatically in 2007 when he scored a sensational KO2 over Canadian contender Dale Brown in Edmonton. He quickly added another upset KO3 over Kelvin Davis who had put him on the deck before in the second round. At this point, Wilson was rated in the Top 10 by The Ring Magazine.

Wilson knocked out hard-punching Emmanuel Nwodo on June 29, 2007. ESPN announcer Teddy Atlas proclaimed it the most devastating knockout ever on ESPN's Friday Night Fights series. It was later named the ESPN.com Knockout of the Year.

He finally got a shot at the WBA cruiserweight title on May 3, 2008, but lost a unanimous decision to Firat Arslan.

Wilson lost his first fight of Season 4 of The Contender to Ehinomen Ehikhamenor.

Professional boxing record 

|-
| style="text-align:center;" colspan="8"|25 Wins (21 knockouts, 4 decisions), 21 Losses (9 knockouts, 12 decision), 3 Draws 
|-  style="text-align:center; background:#e3e3e3;"
|  style="border-style:none none solid solid; "|Result
|  style="border-style:none none solid solid; "|Record
|  style="border-style:none none solid solid; "|Opponent
|  style="border-style:none none solid solid; "|Type
|  style="border-style:none none solid solid; "|Round
|  style="border-style:none none solid solid; "|Date
|  style="border-style:none none solid solid; "|Location
|  style="border-style:none none solid solid; "|Notes
|-align=center
|Loss
|25–21–3
|align=left|Adrian Granat
|KO||2
|October 24, 2015
|align=left| Schulsporthalle, Hamburg, Germany
|align=left|
|-align=center
|Loss
|25–20–3
|align=left|Sergey Kuzmin
|TKO||4
|August 27, 2015
|align=left| The Hangar, Costa Mesa, California, U.S.
|align=left|
|-align=center
|Loss
|25–19–3
|align=left|Mike Perez
|TKO||2
|February 5, 2015
|align=left| The Hangar, Costa Mesa, California, U.S.
|align=left|
|-align=center
|Loss
|25–18–3
|align=left|Vyacheslav Glazkov
|TKO||7
|November 8, 2014
|align=left|Boardwalk Hall, Atlantic City, New Jersey, U.S.
|align=left|
|-align=center
|-align=center
|Win
|25–17–3
|align=left|David Rodriguez
|KO
|6
|December 14, 2013
|align=left|Atlantic City, New Jersey, U.S.
|
|-align=center
|Loss
|24–17–3
|align=left|
|KO
|5
|April 20, 2013
|align=left|Hammond, Indiana, U.S.
|
|-align=center
|Loss
|24–16–3
|align=left|Edmund Gerber
|UD
|8
|November 3, 2012
|align=left|Halle, Germany
|align=left|
|-align=center
|Loss
|24–15–3
|align=left|Juan Carlos Gómez
|TKO
|4
|April 21, 2012
|align=left|Schwerin, Germany
|align=left|
|-align=center
|Loss
|24–14–3
|align=left|Denis Boytsov
|KO
|4
|January 28, 2012
|align=left|Hamburg, Germany
|align=left|
|-align=center
|Loss
|24–13–3
|align=left|Ondrej Pala
|UD
|12
|November 26, 2011
|align=left|Trabzon, Turkey
|align=left|
|-align=center
|Win
|24–12–3
|align=left|Juan Carlos Gomez
|MD
|10
|September 24, 2011
|align=left|Hamburg, Germany
|align=left|
|-align=center
|Loss
|23–12–3
|align=left|Jason Gavern
|TKO
|7
|April 2, 2011
|align=left|Jupiter, Florida, U.S.
|align=left|
|-align=center
|Loss
|23–11–3
|align=left|Travis Walker
|UD
|8
|February 26, 2011
|align=left|Atlanta, Georgia, U.S.
|align=left|
|-align=center
|Loss
|23–10–3
|align=left|Alex Leapai
|UD
|8
|December 4, 2010
|align=left|Broadbeach, Australia
|align=left|
|-align=center
|Loss
|23–9–3
|align=left|Grigory Drozd
|RTD
|10
|July 2, 2009
|align=left|Moscow, Russia
|align=left|
|-align=center
|Loss
|23–8–3
|align=left|Ehinomen Ehikhamenor
|UD
|5
|January 7, 2009
|align=left|Singapore
|align=left|
|-align=center
|Loss
|23–7–3
|align=left|Firat Arslan
|UD
|12
|May 3, 2008
|align=left|Stuttgart, Germany
|align=left|
|-align=center
|Win
|23–6–3
|align=left|Robert Marsh
|TKO
|6
|March 15, 2008
|align=left|Richmond, Virginia, U.S.
|align=left|
|-align=center
|Loss
|22–6–3
|align=left|BJ Flores
|UD
|12
|February 8, 2008
|align=left|Dover, Delaware, U.S.
|align=left|
|-align=center
|Win
|22–5–3
|align=left|Emmanuel Nwodo
|KO
|11
|June 29, 2007
|align=left|New York City, New York, U.S.
|align=left|
|-align=center
|Win
|21–5–3
|align=left|Kelvin Davis
|TKO
|3
|February 23, 2007
|align=left|Scranton, Pennsylvania, U.S.
|
|-align=center
|Win
|20–5–3
|align=left|Dale Brown
|TKO
|2
|January 19, 2007
|align=left|Edmonton, Alberta, Canada
|align=left|
|-align=center
|Win
|19–5–3
|align=left|Daniel Judah
|TKO
|4
|September 28, 2006
|align=left|Glen Burnie, Maryland, U.S.
|
|-align=center
|Loss
|18–5–3
|align=left|Andre Purlette
|UD
|6
|June 30, 2006
|align=left|Hollywood, Florida, U.S.
|align=left|
|-align=center
|Loss
|18–4–3
|align=left|Felix Cora, Jr.
|UD
|10
|March 24, 2006
|align=left|Hollywood, Florida, U.S.
|align=left|
|-align=center
|Loss
|18–3–3
|align=left|Owen Beck
|UD
|8
|January 7, 2006
|align=left|New York City, New York, U.S.
|align=left|
|-align=center
|Loss
|18–2–3
|align=left|Vadim Tokarev
|UD
|10
|August 18, 2005
|align=left|Kazan, Russia
|align=left|
|-align=center
|Win
|18–1–3
|align=left|Rodney Moore
|UD
|8
|May 5, 2005
|align=left|Glen Burnie, Maryland, U.S.
|align=left|
|-align=center
|Win
|17–1–3
|align=left|John Ivan Battle
|TKO
|4
|April 1, 2005
|align=left|Warren, Michigan, U.S.
|
|-align=center
|style="background:#abcdef;"|Draw
|16–1–3
|align=left|George Khalid Jones
|PTS
|10
|August 3, 2004
|align=left|Glen Burnie, Maryland, U.S.
|
|-align=center
|style="background:#abcdef;"|Draw
|16–1–2
|align=left|James Lubwama
|PTS
|12
|May 20, 2004
|align=left|Sault Sainte Marie, Michigan, U.S.
|align=left|
|-align=center
|Win
|16–1–1
|align=left|Forrest Neal
|KO
|3
|March 27, 2004
|align=left|Washington, D.C., U.S.
|
|-align=center
|Win
|15–1–1
|align=left|Anton Robinson
|TKO
|3
|December 9, 2003
|align=left|Pikesville, Maryland, U.S.
|
|-align=center
|Win
|14–1–1
|align=left|Darren Whitley
|UD
|8
|September 26, 2003
|align=left|Washington, D.C., U.S.
|align=left|
|-align=center
|Win
|13–1–1
|align=left|Rodney Moore
|TKO
|3
|June 27, 2003
|align=left|Atlantic City, New Jersey, U.S.
|
|-align=center
|Win
|12–1–1
|align=left|Charles Rasheed Lee
|KO
|1
|May 8, 2003
|align=left|Glen Burnie, Maryland, U.S.
|
|-align=center
|Win
|11–1–1
|align=left|Darren Whitley
|UD
|6
|April 8, 2003
|align=left|Baltimore, Maryland, U.S.
|align=left|
|-align=center
|Win
|10–1–1
|align=left|Dana Rucker
|TKO
|8
|November 14, 2002
|align=left|Glen Burnie, Maryland, U.S.
|align=left|
|-align=center
|Win
|9–1–1
|align=left|Eric Starr
|KO
|1
|September 26, 2002
|align=left|Glen Burnie, Maryland, U.S.
|
|-align=center
|Win
|8–1–1
|align=left|Dennis McKinney
|TKO
|3
|June 20, 2002
|align=left|Glen Burnie, Maryland, U.S.
|
|-align=center
|Win
|7–1–1
|align=left|Iman Green
|TKO
|4
|May 9, 2002
|align=left|Glen Burnie, Maryland, U.S.
|
|-align=center
|Win
|6–1–1
|align=left|Eric Starr
|TKO
|6
|March 21, 2002
|align=left|Glen Burnie, Maryland, U.S.
|
|-align=center
|Win
|5–1–1
|align=left|Sam Reese
|KO
|3
|February 28, 2002
|align=left|Baltimore, Maryland, U.S.
|
|-align=center
|Win
|4–1–1
|align=left|Will Little
|KO
|2
|January 17, 2002
|align=left|Glen Burnie, Maryland, U.S.
|
|-align=center
|Win
|3–1–1
|align=left|William Bailey
|KO
|2
|November 15, 2001
|align=left|Glen Burnie, Maryland, U.S.
|
|-align=center
|Win
|2–1–1
|align=left|Lonnie Kornegay
|TKO
|2
|September 27, 2001
|align=left|Glen Burnie, Maryland, U.S.
|
|-align=center
|Loss
|1–1–1
|align=left|Damien Rice
|UD
|4
|June 16, 2001
|align=left|New York City, New York, U.S.
|
|-align=center
|style="background:#abcdef;"|Draw
|1–0–1
|align=left|Willis Lockett
|PTS
|4
|May 10, 2001
|align=left|Glen Burnie, Maryland, U.S.
|align=left|
|-align=center
|Win
|1–0
|align=left|Rodney Dews
|KO
|1
|November 16, 2000
|align=left|Glen Burnie, Maryland, U.S.
|
|}

Life outside the ring 
Darnell Wilson owns and operates a digital infrastructure firm as a technology systems engineer.

References

External links 
 
Davis-fight
Nwodo-fight

1974 births
Living people
Boxers from Cleveland
Cruiserweight boxers
Systems engineers
The Contender (TV series) participants
American male boxers